Senator Barker may refer to:

George Barker (Virginia politician) (born 1951), Virginia State Senate
H. W. Barker (1860–1950), Wisconsin State Senate
Jacob Barker (1779–1871), New York State Senate
James A. Barker (1858–1943), Wisconsin State Senate
Lewis Barker (politician) (1818–1890), Maine State Senate
Robert L. Barker (died 2010), North Carolina State Senate